Avraham Mordechai Alter (25 December 1865 – 3 June 1948), also known as the Imrei Emes after the works he authored, was the fourth Rebbe of the Hasidic dynasty of Ger, a position he held from 1905 until his death in 1948. He was one of the founders of the Agudas Israel in Poland and was influential in establishing a network of Jewish schools there. It is claimed that at one stage he led over 200,000 Hasidim.

Personal life

Alter had eight children by his first wife, Chaya Ruda Czarna, daughter of Noah Czarny, a prominent Gerrer Hasid in Biala. His eldest son, Rabbi Meir Alter, who was a Torah scholar and businessman, was murdered in Treblinka during the Holocaust with his children and grandchildren. His second son, Rabbi Yitzchak Alter, died in 1934 in Poland.

In 1922, his wife Chaya Ruda died. Some time later he married his niece, Feyge Mintshe Biderman, who bore him his youngest child, Pinchas Menachem Alter, in 1926.

In 1924, Alter visited Palestine together with his brother in-law, Rabbi Hirsh Heynekh Lewin, his son-in-law Rabbi Yitzchak Meir Alter and the Sokolover Rebbe, Rabbi Yitzchak Zelig Morgensztern. Over a six-week period, they visited Jerusalem, Safed, Hebron, Tiberias and Tel Aviv.

World War II
During World War II, Alter was a prime target of the Nazi authorities in German-occupied Poland. In 1940, he managed to escape to Palestine with several of his sons and began to slowly rebuild his Hasidic dynasty. He resided in the Sfas Emes Yeshiva from 1940 until his death in 1948.

Death and legacy

With the outbreak of the 1948 Arab-Israeli War, Alter was trapped in Jerusalem. He died during the holiday of Shavuot of natural causes during the siege of the city by the Jordanian Arab Legion. As bodies could not be removed to the Mount of Olives during wartime, he was buried in the yeshiva courtyard on the condition that he would be reburied elsewhere after the war. However, his sons and successors, the Beis Yisrael and Lev Simcha, declined to go through with the reburial.

After Alter's death, the dynasty continued with his three remaining sons, who became the consecutive next three heads of the Gerrer Hasidim worldwide: Rabbi Yisrael Alter (fifth rebbe of Ger); Rabbi Simchah Bunim Alter (sixth rebbe of Ger); and Rabbi Pinchas Menachem Alter (seventh rebbe of Ger). In 1996, Rabbi Pinchas Menachem Alter was buried next to his father in the courtyard and a red-brick ohel was placed over both graves, which are visited regularly by students in the adjoining yeshiva.

The Hebrew acronym for Rabbi Avraham Mordechai is "Re'em.  A religious moshav in central Israel is named for the Rebbe, Bnei Re'em, (lit. Sons of Re'em) as well as the nearby junction of highway 40 and highway 3.

References

1866 births
1948 deaths
Rebbes of Ger
Polish Hasidic rabbis
20th-century Polish rabbis
Moetzes Gedolei HaTorah
Hasidic rabbis in Ottoman Palestine
Hasidic rabbis in Mandatory Palestine
People from Góra Kalwaria